Tepper is a surname. Notable people with the surname include:

 David Tepper (born 1957), American investor and owner of the NFL's Carolina Panthers
 J. G. O. Tepper (1841–1923), South Australian entomologist
 Jeremy Tepper (born 1963), American country musician
 Leonard Tepper (1939–2001), American actor
 Lou Tepper (born 1945), American football coach
 Robert Tepper, American singer
 Sheri S. Tepper (1929-2016), American author
 Sid Tepper (1918–2015), Jewish American singer and songwriter
 Stephen Tepper (born 1969), hockey player
 Susan Tepper (1943–1991), American artist
 William Tepper (1948–2017), American actor and screenwriter
 Yotam Tepper, Israeli archaeologist

See also 
 Tepper Aviation, a cargo airline
 Tepper School of Business, the business school at Carnegie Mellon University named after David Tepper

Low German surnames
Jewish surnames